Cyril Asker (born December 24, 1985)  is a French mixed martial artist who competed in the Heavyweight division of the Ultimate Fighting Championship.

Background
Born and raised in Avignon, France, Asker began training in MMA at the age of 18. Before becoming a full-time fighter, he was a police officer.

Mixed martial arts career

Ultimate Fighting Championship
Asker made his promotional debut against Jared Cannonier at UFC Fight Night: Rothwell vs. dos Santos on April 10, 2016. He was defeated via knockout in the first round.

Asker next fought Dmitry Smolyakov at UFC Fight Night: Rodríguez vs. Penn on January 15, 2017. He won the fight via TKO in the first round.

Asker next faced Walt Harris at UFC Fight Night: Holm vs. Correia on June 17, 2017. He lost the fight in the first round via TKO due to a combination of elbows and punches.

Asker was expected to face James Mulheron on November 25, 2017, at UFC Fight Night 122. However, Mulheron was pulled from the card on November 10 after he failed an out-of-competition drug test. Asker remained on the card and faced promotional newcomer Hu Yaozong. He won the fight via submission in the second round.

Asker faced Tai Tuivasa on February 11, 2018, at UFC 221. He lost the fight via technical knock out in the first round.

On March 19, 2020, it was reported that Asker was no longer part of the UFC roster.

Championships and accomplishments
Extreme Fighting Championship (EFC)
EFC Heavyweight Championship (One time)

Mixed martial arts record

|-
|Loss
|align=center|9–4
|Tai Tuivasa
|TKO (punches and elbows)
|UFC 221 
|
|align=center|1
|align=center|2:18
|Perth, Australia
|
|-
|Win
|align=center|9–3
|Hu Yaozong
|Submission (rear-naked choke)
|UFC Fight Night: Bisping vs. Gastelum
|
|align=center|2
|align=center|2:33
|Shanghai, China
|
|-
|Loss
|align=center|8–3
|Walt Harris
|TKO (punches and elbows)
|UFC Fight Night: Holm vs. Correia
|
|align=center|1
|align=center|1:44
|Kallang, Singapore
|
|-
|Win
|align=center|8–2
|Dmitry Smolyakov
|TKO (punches and elbows)
|UFC Fight Night: Rodríguez vs. Penn
|
|align=center|1
|align=center|2:41
|Phoenix, Arizona, United States
|
|-
|Loss
|align=center|7–2
|Jared Cannonier
|KO (punches and elbows)
|UFC Fight Night: Rothwell vs. dos Santos
|
|align=center| 1
|align=center| 2:44
|Zagreb, Croatia
| 
|-
|Win
|align=center|7–1
|Andrew van Zyl
|Submission (guillotine choke)
|Extreme Fighting Championship 44
|
|align=center| 1
|align=center| 3:25
|Johannesburg, South Africa
|
|-
|Win
|align=center|6–1
|Ruan Potts
|TKO (retirement)
|Extreme Fighting Championship 40
|
|align=center| 1
|align=center| 5:00
|Johannesburg, South Africa
|
|-
|Win
|align=center|5–1
|Ricky Misholas
|Decision (unanimous)
|Extreme Fighting Championship 37
|
|align=center| 3
|align=center| 5:00
|Johannesburg, South Africa
| 
|-
|Win
|align=center|4–1
|Juhaa Saarinen
|TKO (punches)
|Cage 27
|
|align=center| 2
|align=center| 4:19
|Turku, Finland
| 
|-
|Win
|align=center|3–1
|Eugen Buchmueller
|Submission (rear-naked choke)
|Roundhouse MMA: The Beginning
|
|align=center| 1
|align=center| 0:59
|Berlin, Germany
| 
|-
|Loss
|align=center|2–1
|Karl Moore
|Submission (rear-naked choke)
|CC 17: Rooney vs. Philpott
|
|align=center| 3
|align=center| N/A
|Newry, Northern Ireland
| 
|-
|Win
|align=center|2–0
|Peter Tornow
|Decision (unanimous)
|MMA Berlin: Tournament 33
|
|align=center| 3
|align=center| 5:00
|Berlin, Germany
| 
|-
|Win
|align=center|1–0
|Adam Brearley
|TKO (punches)
|Cage Warriors Fight Night 4
|
|align=center| 1
|align=center| 4:30
|Dubai, United Arab Emirates
|

References

External links
 
 

1985 births
Living people
French male mixed martial artists
Heavyweight mixed martial artists
Mixed martial artists utilizing taekwondo
French practitioners of Brazilian jiu-jitsu
Sportspeople from Vaucluse
French male taekwondo practitioners
Ultimate Fighting Championship male fighters
Mixed martial artists utilizing Brazilian jiu-jitsu
21st-century French people